Skyland Estates is a census-designated place in Warren County, Virginia, just north of Linden. The population as of the 2010 Census was 830.

References

Census-designated places in Warren County, Virginia
Census-designated places in Virginia